Flávio Augusto do Nascimento (born 29 June 1986 in Bossoroca RS), commonly known as Flávio Caça-Rato or simply Caça-Rato , is a Brazilian footballer who last played as a forward for Decisão.

Personal drama
When Caça Rato was 8, his father came home drunk and tried to hang him. When he was almost being hanged his uncle saved him.

Caça-Rato was also shot twice on 1 August 2010 in the town of Campina Barreto, Pernambuco. The incident took place during a party after a Timbauba match — the team he played for at the time. Flavio got caught in an argument with two men, and one of them pulled a gun and shot him in the right leg and on the back. After staying in a hospital, Flavio was medicated and discharged. He started playing football again after a month.

Honours
Sport Recife
Campeonato Pernambucano : 2007, 2008
Copa do Brasil : 2008

Santa Cruz
Campeonato Pernambucano : 2012, 2013

References

External links
 CBF
 meusport

1986 births
Living people
Brazilian footballers
Brazilian expatriate footballers
Brazilian expatriate sportspeople in Croatia
Expatriate footballers in Croatia
Timbaúba Futebol Clube players
Sport Club do Recife players
Salgueiro Atlético Clube players
América Futebol Clube (RN) players
Santa Cruz Futebol Clube players
Clube do Remo players
Guarani FC players
Duque de Caxias Futebol Clube players
Association football forwards
Sportspeople from Recife